David ben Naphtali Fränkel or David Hirschel Fränkel (1704 – 4 April 1762), was a German rabbi.

Biography
Born in Berlin, for a time he was rabbi of Dessau. He became chief rabbi of Berlin in 1742. Fränkel exercised a great influence as teacher over Moses Mendelssohn, who followed him to the Prussian capital. It was Fränkel who introduced Mendelssohn to Maimonides' Moreh Nevuchim, and it was he, too, who befriended his poor disciple, procuring for him free lodging and a few days' board every week in the house of Hayyim Bamberger. His grandson was Jonah Frankel, the German Jewish businessman, banker and philanthropist.

As a Talmudist, Frankel was almost the first to devote himself to a study of the Jerusalem Talmud, which had been largely neglected.

Writings
He gave a great impetus to the study of this work by his Korban ha-Edah ("The Communal Sacrifice"), a commentary in three parts. His additional notes on the Jerusalem Talmud and on Maimonides were published, together with the preceding work, under the title Shirei Korban (Dessau, 1743). Amid the turmoil of the Seven Years' War, he delivered a sermon with the following title:
„Eine Danck-Predigt wegen des wichtigen und wundervollen Siegs : welchen Sr. Königl. Maj. in Preussen am 5ten December, 1757, über die, der Anzahl nach ihm weit überlegene, gesamte oesterreichische Armee in Schlesien, preisswürdig erfochten". Gehalten am Sabbath den 10ten desselben Monats in der Juden Schule zu Berlin, von David Hirschel Fränckel, Ober Rabbi ["A Thanksgiving Sermon, for the Important and Astonishing Victory Obtain’d on 5 December 1757, by the Glorious King of Prussia, over the United and Far Superior Forces of the Austrians in Silesia." Preach’d on the Sabbath of the 10th of the Said Month, at the Synagogue of the Jews in Berlin, by David Hirschel Franckel, Arch-Rabbi].

References

 Its bibliography:
 Azulai, Shem ha-Gedolim, ii. 94
 Eliakim Carmoly, Notices Biographiques, in Revue Orientale, iii. 315
 Moritz Steinschneider, Cat. Bodl. col. 882
 G. Karpeles, Gesch. der Jüdischen Litteratur, pp. 1060, 1071, 1100
 J. H. Dessauer, Gesch. der Israeliten, p. 498
 Heinrich Graetz, Hist. v. 293-294
 Leser Landshuth, Toledot Anshe ha-Shem, pp. 35 et seq., Berlin, 1884
 Meyer Kayserling, Moses Mendelssohn, pp. 9 et seq., Leipzig, 1862

1700s births
1762 deaths
18th-century German rabbis
German Orthodox rabbis
Rabbis from Berlin
People from the Margraviate of Brandenburg
Authors of works on the Jerusalem Talmud
Hebrew-language writers